Glass Trap is a 2005 American science fiction monster movie starring C. Thomas Howell & Stella Stevens and directed by Fred Olen Ray, credited as Ed Raymond.

Plot
An army of giant, radioactive ants are accidentally trapped in a skyscraper, and a group of employees must band together to escape the building.

Cast
 C. Thomas Howell as Curtis
 Siri Baruc as Sharon
 Stella Stevens as Joan Highsmith
 Brent Huff as Dennis
 Andrew Prine as Sheriff Ed
 Chick Vennera as Paolo
 Martin Kove as Corrigan
 Tracy Brooks Swope as Elizabeth
 Peter Spellos as Howard Brunel
 Whitney Sloan as Carly
 John Clement as Jack Warner
 Ron Harper as Henry "Hank" Conlon

Release
Glass Trap was released on DVD by First Look Pictures on August 2, 2005.

Reception

David Cornelius from eFilmCritic 2/5 stars, writing, "Like many direct-to-video features, Glass Trap will do the trick for those who rent these kind of things. It's harmless in its dumbness, painless in its 'gee, get a load of these fake ants we whipped up' presentation. But it's not very entertaining, either." Chris Hartley from Video Graveyard gave the film 1.5 out of 4 stars, criticizing the film's dialogue, weak special effects, and poor attempts at humor.

See also
List of killer insect films

References

External links
 
 
 

2005 films
2005 direct-to-video films
2005 horror films
2000s monster movies
2000s science fiction horror films
American monster movies
American science fiction horror films
Direct-to-video horror films
Films directed by Fred Olen Ray
2000s English-language films
2000s American films